Lawrence J. Corcoran (August 10, 1859 – October 14, 1891) was an American pitcher in Major League Baseball. He was born in Brooklyn, New York.

Corcoran debuted in the 1880 season, where he won 43 games and led the Chicago team to the National League championship. Cap Anson alternated him with pitcher Fred Goldsmith, giving Chicago the first true pitching "rotation" in professional baseball.

In 1882, Corcoran became the first pitcher to throw two no-hitters in a career.  Two seasons later, he became the first pitcher to throw three no-hitters, setting a record that would stand until 1965, when Sandy Koufax threw his fourth no-hitter.  He is also famous for being one of baseball's very few switch-pitchers, and is one of only two players in MLB history whose batting-throwing combination was "bats left, throws both," the other being Pat Venditte. A natural righty, Corcoran pitched four innings alternating throwing arms on June 16, 1884, due to the inflammation of his right index finger.  He is credited with creating the first method of signaling pitches to his catcher,  which consisted of moving a wad of chewing tobacco in his mouth to indicate what pitch would be thrown.

White Stockings catcher Silver Flint, who caught bare-handed, credited Corcoran with being the toughest pitcher to catch and being responsible for several of his misshapen fingers.

Corcoran's arm was dead by 1885, and by 1887 he was out of the league.

Corcoran, afflicted with Bright's disease, died in Newark, New Jersey at the age of 32.  He was interred in the Holy Sepulchre Cemetery in East Orange.

His brother, Mike, pitched in one major league game in 1884.

See also
 List of Major League Baseball annual ERA leaders
 List of Major League Baseball annual strikeout leaders
 List of Major League Baseball annual wins leaders
 List of Major League Baseball no-hitters

References

External links

TheDeadballEra.com – obituary

1859 births
1891 deaths
Sportspeople from Brooklyn
Baseball players from New York City
Major League Baseball pitchers
19th-century baseball players
Chicago White Stockings players
New York Giants (NL) players
Washington Nationals (1886–1889) players
Indianapolis Hoosiers (NL) players
National League ERA champions
National League strikeout champions
National League wins champions
Deaths from nephritis
Brooklyn Chelsea players
Buffalo (minor league baseball) players
Springfield (minor league baseball) players
Holyoke (minor league baseball) players
Nashville Blues players
London Tecumsehs (baseball) players
Deaths from kidney disease
Burials at Holy Sepulchre Cemetery (East Orange, New Jersey)